851 Zeissia  is an S-type asteroid background asteroid from the inner region of the asteroid belt. Its diameter is about 12 km and it has an albedo of 0.2646 . Its rotation period is 9.34 hours.

The asteroid is named after the German optician and company founder Carl Zeiss.

References

External links 
 
 

000851
Discoveries by Sergei Belyavsky
Named minor planets
000851
19160402